is a Buddhist temple in Kamakura, Kanagawa Prefecture, Japan, one of the oldest temples in Kamakura and, together with Hōkai-ji, the only one of the Tendai denomination. The temple is Number one of the Bandō Sanjūsankasho pilgrimage circuit. Two of the three statues of goddess Kannon it enshrines are Important Cultural Properties. Sugimotodera is nicknamed Geba Kannon ("Dismount Kannon"), because horsemen never failed to dismount from their steeds when they passed by. (According to a different version of the legend, non-believers always fell from their horse when passing in front of the temple.)

History 
According to the temple's own records, Sugimoto-dera was founded in 734 by the minister of the Imperial Court Fujiwara no Fusasaki (681 – 737) and priest Gyōki on orders by Emperor Shōmu.

The temple's legend holds that Empress Komyo (701–760) in the Nara Period (710–794) instructed Fujiwara and Gyoki (668–749) to build the temple enshrining a statue of Eleven-Headed Kannon as the main object of worship. It is therefore considered to be the oldest of Kamakura's temples, predating the Kamakura shogunate by half a millennium.

The records say that in the 8th century priest Gyōki was crossing the Kantō region on foot when he saw Kamakura from Mount Taizō (the Taizōzan in the temple's name) and decided to leave there a statue of goddess Kannon. He then carved and enshrined it himself. Later in 734, Emperor Shōmu was told by the goddess herself to build here a temple (the Hon-dō). In 851, the temple was visited by Ennin (794–864), who made a new Eleven-Headed Kannon statue and gave it to the Temple. Again in 985, retired Emperor Kazan (968-1008) told the priest Eshin Sōzu Genshin (942-1017) to carve an additional statue of Eleven-Headed Kannon and enshrine it in the temple. This event made the temple surge to the number one temple in the Bandō Sanjūsankasho pilgrimage circuit, a series of 33 Buddhist temples in Eastern Japan sacred to Goddess Kannon.

Historical accounts of the temple are rare, remaining most of its past largely unknown. Sugimoto-dera certainly predates the Kamakura period (1185–1333) and is therefore, if not the oldest, among the oldest temples in Kamakura. The Azuma Kagami calls it "Ōkura Kannondō", or "Ōkura Kannon Hall", from the old name of the area where it stands.

The temple was visited in 1191 by Shōgun Minamoto no Yoritomo, who ordered extensive repairs.

In 1337, well after the fall of the shogunate in 1333, there was a battle in the temple's premises between Hōjō supporters and Ashikaga forces, and more than 300 samurai lost their lives. The many small gorintō (stone stupas) to the right of the main hall were laid there in memory of those who fell on that occasion.

The history of the temple during the Muromachi period is not known.

Points of interest 
The three sitting statues of Kannon that the Main Hall enshrines are the temple's main object of worship. The statue on the left is supposedly the one Gyōki built, but it appears to belong rather to the late Heian period (from 794 to 1185). In spite of its dubious attribution, the statue is a city Important Cultural Asset. The one in the middle is the statue said to have been made by Ennin, which also seems to go back only to the late Heian period and is a national Important Cultural Asset. The one on the right is the statue traditionally attributed to Genshin, which has been dated to the middle of the Kamakura period and is far too young to really be by him. This work too is a national Important Cultural Asset. Religious tradition notwithstanding, none of the statues seems therefore to be attributable to its supposed author.

One evening in 1189 a fire destroyed the entire Ōkura Kannondō, but the temple's bettō, a man called Jōdai-bō, jumped into the fire and rescued the three statues, laying them under a cedar tree. From this episode stems the present name of the temple, which literally means "Under the cedar tree". The rescue was deemed miraculous, and greatly increased the temple's reputation and the number of its pilgrims. The story was later further embellished claiming that the statues repaired under the tree unaided, and simply were found under the tree.

Finally, the two warriors at the Niō gate (the Niōmon, see photo), are attributed by the temple to famous sculptor Unkei, but the claim is not supported by any evidence.

See also 
 The Glossary of Japanese Buddhism for an explanation of terms concerning Japanese Buddhism, Japanese Buddhist art, and Japanese Buddhist temple architecture.

Notes

References 
 
 
 
 

Buddhist temples in Kamakura, Kanagawa
Tendai temples